K. J. Callahan was a member of the Wisconsin State Assembly from 1931 until 1934. He defeated John A. Cadigan in the 1930 election. Callahan was a member of the Republican Party and a native of Montello, Wisconsin.

References

People from Montello, Wisconsin
Republican Party members of the Wisconsin State Assembly
Year of birth missing
Year of death missing